Club Social y Deportivo Flandria is an Argentine Football Club based in the city of Jáuregui, Buenos Aires Province which was founded by Julio Steverlynck. Although many sports are practised at the club, The Canary is best known for its professional football team. The squad currently plays in Primera B Metropolitana, the regionalised third division of the Argentine football league system.

History
The club originated at the factory Algodonera Flandria (Cotton Flanders), located in Jauregui. In his factory, Don Julio Steverlynck created a lot of job opportunities for the European immigrants in the area. Those immigrants were the people that started to play football to spend their free time. They formed a team and played their first match against Jauregui Juniors.

In 1940, a sports camp was opened and this place was used as a ground field to practice. Months later, they founded a team called Flandria, and started to participate at the Lujanense Soccer League. In 1941, the club designed their first managing board, with Jose Delesie as president.

In 1947 Flandria was affiliated to AFA and started to play on "Tercera de Ascenso". Their first match ended with a comfortable victory 5–3 against Alumni de Villa Urquiza, and Titin Caricato became the first player that scored a goal for Flandria.

In 1952 the Canary became champion and obtains promotion to Primera C, where the team did excellent performances in 1953 y 1957, reaching the second place.

In 1960 Flandria inaugurated their own ground field, called Carlos V, which has a capacity of 5,000 spectators.

In 1970 Flandria became champion of the Primera C, by winning in a breakthrough against Sarmiento de Junín with 3–1. Two goals were scored by Nocella and one by Apariente.

In 1979 Flandria lost their place in Primera C, closing the most important chapter in their history.

In 1998, with Omar Santorelli as manager, Flandria returns to Primera B.

In 2014 Flandria, after a bad campaign, lost their place in Primera B.

They win the promotion to the second category of the Argentine football for the first time in history on 12 June 2016, after clinching the Primera B Metropolitana championship.

However, for the 2017-18 season the team is relegated again to Primera B
.

Current squad

Titles
Primera D (1): 1952
Primera C (1): 1997–98
Primera B Metropolitana: 2016

External links

Official website
Club Flandria
Flandria Locura

References

Association football clubs established in 1941
Football clubs in Buenos Aires Province
1940 establishments in Argentina